Novaya Burma (Yañı Borma) is a rural locality (a selo) in Askinsky Selsoviet, Askinsky District, Bashkortostan, Russia. The population was 189 as of 2010. There are 5 streets.

Geography 
Novaya Burma is located 10 km northeast of Askino (the district's administrative centre) by road. Avaday is the nearest rural locality.

References 

Rural localities in Askinsky District